The Girls' Youth European Volleyball Championship is a volleyball competition for girls' national teams with players under the age of 18 years, currently held biannually and organized by the European Volleyball Confederation, the volleyball federation for Europe. Until 2017 edition age limit was U17. As of the 2024 edition, the CEV will align the age limit for the men's and women's competitions to U18.

Results summary

Medal summary

Participating nations

References

Sources
CEV Girls Youth Volleyball European Championship – Competition History

 
Girls U17
Volleyball
European volleyball records and statistics
1995 establishments in Europe